Parliamentary elections were held in Syria on 7 July 1947, with a second round in some constituencies on 18 July. They were the first elections since official independence in 1946.

Electoral system
A new electoral law was approved by Parliament in May 1947. This introduced a two-round system, with members elected from single-member constituencies by universal male suffrage. Any candidate that received more than 10% of the vote was allowed to contest the second round if no candidate had received an absolute majority. Ten seats were reserved for Bedouins, one of which was for the Jabal Druze. The electoral law also required voting to be extended by a day if first round turnout in a constituency was less than 60%.

Campaign
Prior to the elections, the National Bloc split into two factions. The National Party of President Shukri al-Quwatli was formed in early 1947, with a group of Aleppo-based opponents of al-Quwatli forming another faction. Al-Quwatli's opponents and members of the newly formed Ba'ath Party contested the elections together under the Liberal Party (Hizb al-Ahrar) name.

Neither the National Party or its opponents produced a lengthy manifesto. The National Party was largely interested in protecting wealthy residents of Damascus, while the Aleppo-based opposition published a short manifesto proposing reforms in rural areas to raise the standard of living.

Results

Aftermath
Following the elections, Fares al-Khoury was elected Speaker and incumbent Prime Minister Jamil Mardam Bey was appointed to form a government by al-Quwatli. In 1948 the non-Baath Party opposition members formed the People's Party.

References

Syria
Parliament
Parliamentary elections in Syria
Election and referendum articles with incomplete results